Samayer Kache is a 2018 Bengali short film written and directed by Suryoday De.The film was based on a 1968 Bengali novel by Buddhadev Dasgupta. The film was shown in Kolkata International Film Festival.The film was given 4.5/5 by a review on TOI and was praised as "A brave film against superstitious beliefs and social stigmas".The film was nominated for the Satyajit Ray Award.

External links
 

1968 films
Bengali-language Indian films
Films directed by Buddhadeb Dasgupta
Indian short films
1960s Bengali-language films
1968 short films